The 2018 Minnesota Golden Gophers football team represented the University of Minnesota in the 2018 NCAA Division I FBS football season. The Golden Gophers played their home games at TCF Bank Stadium in Minneapolis, Minnesota and competed in the West Division of the Big Ten Conference. They were led by second-year head coach P. J. Fleck.

Minnesota began the year by sweeping its non-conference slate against New Mexico State, Fresno State, and Miami (OH); but opened Big Ten Conference play with four straight losses. The team secured wins against Indiana and Purdue, and then secured bowl eligibility by defeating rival Wisconsin for the first time since 2003, and the first time on the road since 1994. The team finished the regular season tied for fifth in the Big Ten West Division with a conference record of 3–6. They were invited to the Quick Lane Bowl where they defeated Georgia Tech to end the year with an overall record of 7–6.

The team's starting quarterback was true freshman Zack Annexstad before he suffered an internal midsection injury in the game against Nebraska on October 20. He did not return for the rest of the season, and redshirt freshman Tanner Morgan took his place under center. Both Annexstad and Morgan finished with nine touchdowns on the year. The team's leading rusher was Mohamed Ibrahim, with 1,160 rushing yards; and the team's leading receiver was Tyler Johnson with 1,169 receiving yards and 12 receiving touchdowns, which tied for the conference lead. Johnson was named first-team All-Big Ten by the media voters. Defensive lineman Carter Coughlin and linebacker Blake Cashman each finished with 15 tackles for loss and were both named second-team All-Big Ten.

Previous season
The Golden Gophers finished the 2017 season 5–7, 2–7 in Big Ten play to finish in sixth place in the West Division.

Preseason

Award watch lists

Schedule 

Source:

Roster

Game summaries

New Mexico State

Fresno State

Miami (OH)

at Maryland

Iowa

at Ohio State

at Nebraska

Indiana

at Illinois

Purdue

Northwestern

at Wisconsin

vs. Georgia Tech (Quick Lane Bowl)

Awards and honors

Players drafted into the NFL

References

Minnesota
Minnesota Golden Gophers football seasons
Quick Lane Bowl champion seasons
Minnesota Golden Gophers football